There is a body of films featuring unmanned aerial vehicles colloquially known as drones. The Hollywood Reporter wrote in February 2016, "There has been no shortage of films dealing with drones over the last few years... audiences have recently had the occasion to explore a form of modern warfare whose true repercussions are yet to be fully understood, let alone divulged to the general public." The Wall Street Journals Caryn James said of drone technology, "Movies and television shows increasingly grapple with those unprecedented aspects of war," highlighting Good Kills release in 2015. James said, "These new films and shows have to keep the action going in situation rooms full of computers, rather than in trenches and on battlefields. And they address moral and strategic questions that old-fashioned World War II movies never had to."

Henry Barnes wrote in The Guardian in April 2016, "In real life, drone warfare has prompted protests, legal action and revolt. Until now, films about drones haven't properly engaged in the debate. They either forget there's someone at the controls, emphasising the alien nature of a remote, robotic death, or, like London Has Fallen, use drones as just another weapon in the arsenal; a cool tool to make bigger, badder bangs." Barnes highlighted Eye in the Sky (2015) as an example of "one of the first drone movies to work in the grey areas" of drone warfare. Jason Bourque wrote in The New York Times of Good Kill and Eye in the Sky, "Those films examined the moral struggles of military personnel as they conduct missions with clinical precision while far removed from danger."

List of films

References

 
Drones, list of films featuring